Bobcat Goldthwait's Misfits & Monsters is a 2018 anthology horror comedy television series created by Bobcat Goldthwait.

Episodes

References

External links

2010s American black comedy television series
2018 American television series debuts
2010s American anthology television series
2018 American television series endings
English-language television shows
TruTV original programming